Daniil Yevgenyevich Pavlov (born 5 June 2002) is a Russian football player. He plays as a centre-forward for Tyumen on loan from PFC Sochi.

Club career
He made his Russian Premier League debut for PFC Sochi on 26 July 2021 in a game against FC Nizhny Novgorod. He substituted Timofei Margasov in the 85th minute.

Career statistics

References

External links
 
 
 

2002 births
Living people
Sportspeople from Tula, Russia
Russian footballers
Association football forwards
Association football midfielders
FC Arsenal Tula players
PFC Sochi players
FC Dynamo Brest players
FC Tyumen players
Russian Premier League players
Belarusian Premier League players
Russian expatriate footballers
Expatriate footballers in Belarus
Russian expatriate sportspeople in Belarus